That Can Happen to Anyone is a 1952 West German comedy film directed by Paul Verhoeven and starring Heinz Rühmann, and Gustav Knuth. It was made at the Bavaria Studios in Munich. The film's sets were designed by the art director Hans Sohnle.

Cast

References

Bibliography

External links 
 

1952 films
1952 comedy films
German comedy films
West German films
1950s German-language films
Films directed by Paul Verhoeven (Germany)
German black-and-white films
Films shot at Bavaria Studios
1950s German films